Montoggio is a comune (municipality) in the Metropolitan City of Genoa in the Italian region Liguria, located about  northeast of Genoa.

Antropic geography 
 
 Acquafredda inferiore
 Acquafredda superiore
 Barche
 Bargagliotti
 Bromia
 Brugosecco
 Ca’
 Ca’ Giacomini
 Cagliardo
 Campelo
 Camponevoso
 Campovecchio
 Casà
 Casalino
 Carpi inferiore
 Carpi superiore
 Cascinette
 Case vecchie di Carsegli
 Cagliasca
 Castello
 Castiglione
 Chiappa
 Chiappari
 Cravasco
 Creto
 Colletta
 Ciana dei Ponti
 Costa inferiore
 Costa superiore
 Cognole di Carsegli
 Cognole dei Ponti
 Cornaggiana
 Corneto
 Cuneo dei Corsi
 Dego
 Fascioli
 Feglietto
 Fontana Chiappa
 Fontanasse
 Fregagliasse
 Gazzolo
 Gorretta
 Granara
 Luega
 Maglioni
 Matallo
 Montemoro
 Morasco
 Noci
 Piandeiso
 Prele
 Pratolungo
 Ponti
 Pratogrande
 Pianoguani
 Rivè
 Sanguineto inferiore
 Sanguineto superiore
 Sella
 Serrato
 Soriva inferiore
 Soriva superiore
 Terme
 Tre Fontane
 Vallecalde
 Veixe
 Rione
 Poggio
 Montebano

Montoggio borders the following municipalities: Casella, Davagna, Genoa, Sant'Olcese, Serra Riccò, Torriglia, Valbrevenna.

Demographic evolution

Twin towns — sister cities
Montoggio is twinned with:

  Radomyšl, Czech Republic (2006)
  Zonza, France (2006)

See also 
 Monte Alpesisa

Gallery

References

External links
 www.comune.montoggio.ge.it/

Cities and towns in Liguria